William Joseph "Smokey Joe" Martin (July 28, 1911 – September 28, 1960) was a Major League Baseball third baseman.

External links

1911 births
1960 deaths
New York Giants (NL) players
Chicago White Sox players
Baseball players from Missouri
UC Santa Barbara Gauchos baseball players
Nashville Vols players